Zuzana Schindlerová (born 25 April 1987) is Czech athlete, whose specialization is race walking. She was born in Baška, Czechoslovakia.

Biography
She competed at championship in Lugano 9 March 2008 with a time 1:33:15 A-limit at 20 km race and has qualified for 2008 Summer Olympics in Beijing. She has finished the olympic race as 27th with time 1:32:57. 6 minutes and 26 seconds behind the winner Olga Kaniskina from Russia. In the year of 2009 she has won the silver medal in Kaunas, Lithuania at European Athletics U23 Championships. At IAAF World Championships in Athletics in Berlin 2009 she finished 19th.

She has won the Czech Championships in 20 km racewalking twice. She won the first gold in 2008 in Poděbrady.

References

External links
 
 
 
 
 Profile at Race Walk UK
 Profile at World rankings
 
 Profile at The-Sports.org
 Profile at All-Athletics.com

Czech female racewalkers
World Athletics Championships athletes for the Czech Republic
Olympic athletes of the Czech Republic
Athletes (track and field) at the 2008 Summer Olympics
Living people
1987 births